Spalacomimus talpa is a species of katydids.

Distribution
This species is present in East Tropical Africa, Tanzania, Arusha or Zanzibar.

References 

Tettigoniidae
Insects described in 1869